The Sen. William H. Thompson House, at 902 N. 6th St. in Garden City, Kansas, was built in 1907.  It was listed on the National Register of Historic Places in 1996.

It was a home of U.S. Senator William H. Thompson (1871-1928).

It is a three-story Classical Revival-style house on a high cement stone block foundation.

References

External links

Houses on the National Register of Historic Places in Kansas
Neoclassical architecture in Kansas
Houses completed in 1907
Finney County, Kansas